Viktor Maksimovich Zhirmunsky (2 August 1891 – 31 January 1971; also Wiktor Maximowitsch Schirmunski, Zirmunskij, Schirmunski, Zhirmunskii) was a Soviet and Russian literary historian and linguist.

Life
Born in Saint Petersburg in 1891 to a Jewish family, Zhirmunsky was a professor at universities in Saratov and Leningrad, and a member of the Academy of Sciences of the Soviet Union.

He was a representative of Russian formal studies, though in certain respects he was less inclined to accept formalism as sufficient for all literary analysis. His critique of the ahistorical nature of formalism, in the introduction to his translation of Oskar Walzel′s Die künstlerische Form des Dichtwerkes (1919) helped speed the end of Russian formalism's initial phase, as critics began to accommodate their work to the developing ideology of the Soviet regime.

Though originally trained in German Romanticism, he started to research the epics of the Asian people of the Soviet Union after he was settled in Tashkent following the evacuation of Leningrad. In particular, he studied the aqyn of Kazakh and Kyrgyz culture. This research created a foundation that allowed Yeleazar Meletinsky to make his considerations on the relations between myth and epos.

In April 1948, Zhirmunsky was among the scholars and critics who recanted their supposed "comparativism" and "Veselovskyism" in Andrei Zhdanov′s purge of that year. "Comparativism," or the study of possible borrowing and dissemination of motifs and stories among cultures, was deprecated. In response, Zhirmunsky developed a historical-typological theory, according to which such similarities arose not from historical influence but rather from a similarity of social and cultural institutions.

He died in Leningrad in 1971.

Works
Skazanie ob Alpamise i bogatirskaya skazka, Moskva 1960
Narodnij geroicheskiy epos, Moskva 1962
Related works:
 E.M. Meletinskij, Proischoždenie geroičeskogo eposa, Moskva 1963

Notes

References

External links
Viktor Maksimovic Zirmunskij 

 V.M. Žirmunskij: Russian Literature: A special issue
The Lyrical Heritage of the Young V.M. Zhirmunskii

1891 births
1971 deaths
20th-century Russian historians
20th-century linguists
20th-century Russian male writers
Corresponding Fellows of the British Academy
Full Members of the USSR Academy of Sciences
Members of the German Academy of Sciences at Berlin
Members of the Royal Danish Academy of Sciences and Letters
Academic staff of Saratov State University
Recipients of the Order of Lenin
Recipients of the Order of the Red Banner of Labour
Dialectologists
Germanists
Russian formalism
Textbook writers
Linguists from Russia
Linguists from the Soviet Union
Russian literary historians
Russian male writers
Russian Jews
Soviet literary historians
Soviet male writers

Soviet Jews
Academic staff of Herzen University